Abbott and Smith were a firm of organ builders based in Leeds, England from 1869 to 1964.

History

Isaac Abbott established the firm in Leeds in 1869. He had worked for William Hill in London for 20 years. Another Hill employee, William Stanwix Smith, was manager until Isaac Abbott retired in 1889. The firm followed the tonal style of Edmund Schulze.

From 1889 William Smith and Isaac Abbott’s son continued the firm. Later it passed to Smith’s sons and grandson.

In 1964 the firm was bought by J.H. Horsfall.

List of organs

St Peter's Church, Parwich 1873
St Mary's Church, Chaddesden 1876 
All Souls, Blackman Lane 1877
St Andrew's Church, Aysgarth 1880
St Michael's Church, Derby 1880 enlarged
Church of All Souls, Bolton 1881 
St Mary's Church, Sileby 1882 (enlarged)
St Mary's Church, Eastling 1882
St John the Baptist's Church, Kirby Wiske 1883
St Anne's Church, Southowram, Halifax 1884 
Holy Trinity Church, Queensbury 1884
Holy Trinity Church, Wensley 1885
St Peter and St Paul's Church, Bolton-by-Bowland 1886
AllSaints' Church, Newton-on-Ouse 1886
Holy Trinity Church, Skipton 1888 organ moved
Blenheim Palace 1888 (now in St Swithun's church, Hither Green)
Our Lady and the English Martyrs Church, Cambridge 1890
Church of St Alkelda, Giggleswick
St George's Minster, Doncaster 1894 new console and blowing equipment
St John's Church, Silverdale 1897
St John and All Saints' Church, Easingwold 1903
Emmanuel Cathedral, Durban 1912
Daisy Street Church, Govanhill 
The old Sōgakudō Concert Hall, Tokyo 1920 
The King's School, Pontefract, West Yorkshire. 1934 (NPOR N07106)
St Luke's Church, Wallsend, Tyneside. Undated (NPOR G00156)
Trinity Church, Goole. East Yorkshire.  Installed date as yet unknown. Organ Removed to Germany 2018.
St Thomas Episcopal Church, Aboyne, Aberdeenshire
St John the Evangelist, Ben Rydding (Ilkley), West Yorkshire. 1909 (rebuilt in 1933) 
St Thomas of Canterbury, Waterloo, Liverpool. Installation date unknown. To be moved soon. 
St John the Evangelist, Palmers Green, London. Installed in 1904 renovated in 1925 by Harrison & Harrison and again in 1955 by Wm. Hill & Son and Norman & Beard.
Trinity Methodist Church, South Elmsall, West Yorkshire c.1900 (NPOR E00115)
All Saints' Church, South Kirkby, West Yorkshire 1931 - rebuild of original unknown maker (NPOR S00164)
Northfield Methodist Church, South Kirkby, West Yorkshire c.1900. Church demolished c.1976 and organ moved to Barnsley Road Methodist Church, South Elmsall, West Yorkshire. (NPOR E00118)
Dun Laoghaire Methodist Church, Dublin, Ireland

References

Pipe organ building companies
Organ builders of the United Kingdom
Companies established in 1869
Defunct companies based in Leeds
Manufacturing companies based in Leeds
1869 establishments in England
Musical instrument manufacturing companies of the United Kingdom